Reception is a one-act comedy by Maxim Gorky. It was first published in the in 1910, in Sovremenny Mir under its original title. Simultaneously it came out as a separate edition under the title Children, via the Berlin-based Ladyzhnikov Publishers. 

Gorky mentioned it in his 20 November 1910 letter to Mykhailo Kotsiubynsky: "I send you my Reception, perhaps it will make you smile," he wrote from Capri.

Characters
 Prince Svir-Mokshanski, of uncertain age, balding and frail
 Bubenhof, solid and behaves like a conqueror
Mokey Zobnin, of around fifty, shifty, perky and prone to fantasizing
 Ivan Kichkin, old, fat and unhealthy
 Pyotr Tipunov, soft-spoken and peace-loving
 Kostya Zryakhov, a plump young man, speaks condescendingly and with unexpectedly long vowels
 Yevstigneyka, a disheveled character with eyes of a lunatic
 Tatyana Zobnina, a widow, stout and moving lazily
 Marya Viktorovna, a perky and lively girl
 Drunken passenger, Old woman with a petition, the Station master, Bykov the janitor, the Gendarme, the Telegraph man

Synopsis
Two rival families of the local merchants grudgingly unite to buy a huge plot of land from a local aristocrat, with a view to build a timber factory. The reception at the railway station astounds the Prince (who arrives with a German companion). He is delighted with the way how the people here admire him and are such pure and nice creatures, 'like children'. Some other locals (including a perpetuum mobile inventor) join the party with their pleas and complaints. The celebration turns sour when it transpires that the land has just been sold, to the German man.

References

External links
 Дети. The original Russian text

1910 plays
Russian plays
Plays by Maxim Gorky